Baqerabad (also Romanized as Bāqerābād; also known as Bāqelābād and Bāqirābād) is a village in Babarashani Rural District, Chang Almas District, Bijar County, Kurdistan Province, Iran. At the 2006 census, its population was 23, in 4 families. The village is populated by Kurds.

References 

Towns and villages in Bijar County
Kurdish settlements in Kurdistan Province